ADDC may stand for:
Associação Direitos dos Cidadãos, the Portuguese name of the Citizens' Rights Association, a Macau political party
Abu Dhabi Desert Challenge
 AC/DC, an Australian rock band.